The Count of Monte Cristo (Spanish: El Conde de Montecristo) is a 1942 Mexican historical adventure film directed by Roberto Gavaldón and Chano Urueta and starring Arturo de Córdova, Mapy Cortés, Rafael Baledón, y Esperanza Baur. It is based on Alexandre Dumas's 1844 novel The Count of Monte Cristo. a story which has been adapted for film many times.

Partial cast
 Arturo de Córdova as Edmundo Dantés / Conde de Montecristo  
 Mapy Cortés as Haydée  
 Anita Blanch as Condesa Eloisa de Villefort  
 Consuelo Frank as Condesa Mercedes de Morcef  
 Gloria Marín as Baronesa Herminia de Danglars  
 Miguel Arenas as Gerardo Villefort  
 Julio Villarreal as Abate Faria  
 Carlos López Moctezuma as Baron Danglars  
 Esperanza Baur as Valentina Villefort  
 Rafael Baledón as Maximiliano Morrel  
 Abel Salazar as Alberto de Morcef  
 Tito Junco as Luciano Debray  
 Amparo Morillo
 Víctor Velázquez as Beauchamp  
 José Morcillo as Gaspard Caderousse  
 Agustín Isunza 
 Blanca Rosa Otero 
 René Cardona as Fernando Mondego / Conde de Morcef  
 Domingo Soler as Señor Morell

External links

1942 films
1940s historical adventure films
Mexican historical adventure films
1940s Spanish-language films
Films based on The Count of Monte Cristo
Films directed by Chano Urueta
Films directed by Roberto Gavaldón
Films set in the 19th century
Mexican black-and-white films
Films set in Paris
1940s Mexican films